The eastern Ukraine campaign is a theatre of operation in the ongoing 2022 Russian invasion of Ukraine that affects three oblasts in eastern Ukraine: Donetsk Oblast and Luhansk Oblast (collectively the Donbas) and Kharkiv Oblast. The invasion is an escalation or intensification of the Russo-Ukrainian War, which had been waged between Ukraine and Russian proxies since 2014.

The battle of Donbas is a major offensive in this theatre of operations and is considered to be the second strategic phase of the invasion. By July 2022, Russian forces and their separatist allies had captured the cities of Sievierodonetsk, Lysychansk, Rubizhne and Izium. However, in early September, Ukraine launched a major counteroffensive in the east, which recaptured the cities of Izium, Balakliia, Kupiansk, Sviatohirsk and the strategic city of Lyman. Outside of the Donbas, there are ongoing battles in the cities of Kreminna and Svatove.

Overview 
Sporadic fighting had been taking place since 2014 between Ukrainian forces and Russian-backed separatists from the Donetsk People's Republic during the war in Donbas.

On 24 February 2022, Russian forces and their separatist allies launched an offensive thrust along lines of contact into the Donbas.

Fighting has also taken place in Sievierodonetsk and Avdiivka. At the siege of Mariupol, Russians forces from Crimea were supported by irregular troops of the Donetsk People's Republic.

On 18 April, Ukrainian and Russian authorities both announced the beginning of the battle of Donbas, a large-scale push to capture all of Luhansk and Donetsk Oblasts.

Timeline

February 2022 
On the morning of 25 February, Russian forces advanced from the Donetsk People's Republic (DPR) towards Mariupol, encountering Ukrainian forces in Pavlopil. The Ukrainians were victorious, destroying at least 20 Russian tanks in the process. In the evening the Russian Navy began an amphibious assault 70 kilometers (43 miles) from Mariupol, along the coast of the Sea of Azov. In Starobilsk, the Ukrainian Armed Forces reportedly destroyed a group of Russian soldiers attempting to cross the river Aidar during a battle. Starobilsk was reported to have been heavily damaged by Russian artillery barrages the next day, 26 February, while Russian forces continued to bombard Mariupol with artillery throughout the day

On the morning of 27 February, it was reported that a Russian tank column was quickly advancing towards Mariupol from the DPR, but the attack was prevented by Ukrainian forces. Six Russian soldiers were captured. Luhansk Oblast governor Serhiy Haidai stated that Stanytsia Luhanska and Shchastia were captured by Russian forces, who practically destroyed the settlements with shelling. Donetsk Oblast governor Pavlo Kyrylenko also accused them of destroying Volnovakha.

March 2022 

On 1 March, Ukrainian forces began a counteroffensive toward Horlivka, which had been controlled by the DPR since late 2014.

A large Russian convoy of more than 60 vehicles entered Starobilsk on 2 March, but was stopped from advancing by protesting locals. The Verkhovna Rada meanwhile stated that Russian shelling on Izyum killed eight people. Russian forces entered the town of Balakliia during the day. Separatist-held Donetsk had been under shelling for several days. Some neighborhoods had no electricity supply and there were burnt cars on the streets.

Ukrainian official Oleksiy Arestovych stated that the Ukrainian forces went on the offensive for the first time during the war, advancing towards Horlivka. Ihor Zhdanov later claimed that "there were reports" that a part of the city had been captured by Ukrainian forces. According to Ukrainian reports, Ukraine's 95th Air Assault Brigade had begun attacking the city the previous day. The Ukrainian Army stationed themselves at the city's outskirts.

Ukrainian authorities stated on 3 March that 34 civilians were killed in Russian shelling in Mariupol in the previous 24 hours. Russian forces entered Svatove during the day but were stopped by protesting locals. The soldiers were later convinced by locals to withdraw from the town. Forces of the Luhansk People's Republic and Russian troops meanwhile captured Novoaidar during the day.

On 5 March, a ceasefire was declared in Volnovakha to allow civilians to evacuate, but was later scuttled with Ukrainian officials blaming Russian shelling continuing during the evacuation process. They added that about 400 civilians were still able to leave the city. Russian President Vladimir Putin however blamed Ukrainian forces for the breakdown of the ceasefire agreement.

On 6 March, a second attempt to evacuate civilians from Mariupol was prevented, with both sides blaming each other. Haidai stated that fighting was taking place on the outskirts of Lysychansk, Sievierodonetsk and Rubizhne, while Popasna and Hirske were being continuously shelled. He added that Ukrainian forces had lost control of Svatove, Starobilsk and Novopskov, but they did not contain any significant presence of Russian troops.

On 8 March, Ukrainian officials stated that 10 civilians were killed and eight wounded in shelling on Severodonetsk during the day. The next day, 9 March, a building acting as a maternity ward and children's hospital in Mariupol was bombed by the Russian Air Force at around 17:00, killing five civilians and injuring 17.

On 10 March, the Ukrainian Defence Ministry claimed that Ukrainian forces were repelling Russian attacks in the areas of Donetsk, Slobozhanske and part of Tavrij. On 11 March, the Russian Defence Ministry stated that the forces of the DPR had captured Volnovakha. It also claimed that they had advanced  and had further tightened the siege of Mariupol. Videos later posted on social media showed Russian forces in many neighborhoods of Volnovakha. Haidai, meanwhile, stated that Russian forces had by now occupied 70 percent of Luhansk Oblast.

On 12 March, the Associated Press independently confirmed that Volnovakha had been captured by pro-Russian separatists and much of it had been destroyed in the fighting. On the same day, Ukrainian forces confirmed the death of Colonel Valery Hudz, the commander of the Ukrainian 24th Mechanized Brigade whilst fighting on the Luhansk frontline. Pavlo Kyrylenko, the governor  of Donetsk Oblast, stated that the settlements of Nikolske, Manhush and Urzuf were occupied by Russian troops. He added that all the cities in the oblast, except for Volnovakha, were under control of Ukrainian forces.

Meanwhile, Ukrainian officials accused Russia of using white phosphorus munitions on the town of Popasna, located in the Donetsk Oblast, during the night. Further in the south of the oblast, the Sviatohirsk Lavra monastery was bombed around 22:00, wounding 30 people and damaging the monastery.

The Russian Defence Ministry stated on 13 March that Russian forces had captured the settlements of Nikolske, Blahodatne, Volodymyrivka and Pavlivka in Donetsk Oblast, in an attempt to reach Velyka Novosilka. The Ukrainian military stated that Russian forces had captured the settlements of Staromlynivka, Yevhenivka, Pavlivka and Yehorivka during the day.

On 14 March, Donetsk was hit by a missile attack. Denis Pushilin, the head of the Donetsk People's Republic, stated that they had shot down a Ukrainian Tochka-U fired on the city of Donetsk, but parts of it fell at the city centre, killing multiple civilians. The Russian Defense Ministry stated that 23 civilians were killed and 28 more wounded. However, the Ukrainian military denied conducting the attack and stated that it was "unmistakably a Russian rocket or another munition," and open-source investigators supported this.

Ukrainian forces later said that Russian troops of the 336th Guards Naval Infantry Brigade and the 11th Guards Air Assault Brigade had tried to advance in the Donetsk Oblast at 17:00, but were repulsed with up to 100 soldiers killed and six of their vehicles being destroyed.

On 15 March, Haidai stated that four civilians were killed due to the shelling by Russian forces hitting a hospital, a care facility for children with visual impairment, and three schools in Rubizhne. On 20 March, Russian officials confirmed that a deputy commander of the Black Sea Fleet, Andrey Paliy was killed in Mariupol.

On 22 March, the head of the LPR, Leonid Pasechnik, claimed that "almost 80% of the territory" of the Luhansk region is occupied and "Popasnaya, Lisichansk, Rubizhne, Severodonetsk and Kremennaya have not been liberated." He noted that the situation in the battlefields is "stably tense" and units of the People's Militia of the LPR are striving to take Popasnaya and Rubizhne under control. The Russian defence ministry claimed that DPR forces captured Marinka.

On 25 March, the Russian defence ministry stated that Russia is prepared to enter the second phase of military operations in seeking to occupy major Ukrainian cities in eastern Ukraine. This was reported by Reuters saying: "Russian news agencies quoted the defence ministry as saying that Russian-backed separatists now controlled 93% of Ukraine's Luhansk region and 54% of the Donetsk region – the two areas that jointly make up the Donbass." The Luhansk People's Republic claimed to have captured the villages of Ivanivka and Novosadove on 28 March.

Late on 29 March, local officials reported a series of explosions outside the Russian city of Belgorod, close to the border with Ukraine. According to Russia's TASS agency, a temporary Russian military camp was hit by a shell fired from the Ukrainian side, wounding at least four.

Battle of Donbas begins and Ukrainian counteroffensives (April 2022–present)

April 2022

After Russia abandoned its offensive to capture Kyiv, it shifted its attention to eastern and southern Ukraine. The Russian military began redeploying units from northern Ukraine to the east, but many of these troops appeared to be nearly combat-ineffective due to heavy losses. However, Russia still amassed tens of thousands of troops, declaring its aim to fully capture the Donetsk and Luhansk Oblasts. It managed to secure Izium on 1 April, although heavy fighting continued around the settlement over the next few days.

Russia and the pro-Russian separatists continued to besiege Mariupol, where they made little progress. However, Russian troops managed to divide the Ukrainian holdouts in Mariupol into two or three pockets on 10 April. At the same time, Russia made concentrated efforts to conquer the strategically important cities of Sievierodonetsk, Popasna, and Rubizhne. It launched repeated attacks on these locations from 10 April. Russia made little progress in these attacks, and Ukraine claimed that it had inflicted a heavy defeat on the Russian  on 11 April.

To support the operations aimed at Sievierodonetsk, Popasna, and Rubizhne, Russia made a push south of Izium toward Barvinkove and Sloviansk. Ukraine responded by shifting more units to hold off the Russians at Izium. At the same time, Russia attacked around Kharkiv to pin down local Ukrainian forces. Russia had made only limited gains at Izium by 12 April, but more Russian forces continued to arrive, to reinforce the offensive.

On 13 April, it was reported that Russia was attempting to assemble a force large enough to outnumber the Ukrainian soldiers in eastern Ukraine by five times, in an attempt to finally win a decisive victory in the Donbas. On 16 April, Russia warned the remaining defenders of Mariupol to surrender; the Ukrainians ignored the demand.

In Kharkiv increased shelling hit the city, killing five and injuring 13. The BBC reported that multiple air strikes had hit villages and cities in eastern Ukraine. Russian forces continued to launch localized attacks, probing Ukrainian defenses. Meanwhile, Ukraine launched counter-attacks, and retook several small towns and villages near Kharkiv and Izium.

On 18 April 2022, according to Ukrainian officials, Russia launched a new offensive in the Donbas along a 300-mile front, with  1,260 military targets being hit by rockets and artillery according to Russian officials. Russian commander Rustam Minnekayev later claimed that this renewed offensive aimed at not only seizing Donbas, but also securing southern Ukraine so that Russia could establish a land connection to Transnistria. The initial Russian bombardment focused on Rubizhne, Popasna, and Marinka.

On the same day, it was reported that Russian and LNR troops had entered the city of Kreminna, capturing it after a few hours of clashes with the Ukrainian Army. LNR commander Mikhail Kishchik was killed in this battle. Over the next days, Russia gained little territory despite attacks all across the frontline. Facing heavy Ukrainian resistance, the Russian and separatist forces were able to advance into parts of Rubizhne, Popasna, and Sievierodonetsk. Some reports also suggested that fighting in Kreminna was still ongoing.
On 21 April, the Russians claimed to have killed over 4,000 Ukrainian troops in Mariupol, and to have captured a further 1,478. By 23 April, Ukrainian counter-attacks had reportedly further stalled the Russian advance.

In the following days, Russia continued its attempts to break through the Ukrainian defenses, possibly to encircle the Izium-Donetsk City salient. Fighting was concentrated at Sievierodonetsk, Rubizhne, Popasna, Marinka, Kharkiv, and Izium. Russia, the LPR, and DPR made limited gains, capturing a number of villages and the towns of Popivka, Pischane, Zhytlivka, and Kreminna. However, their overall advance was slow, and stalled in most areas of the frontline. Ukraine also mounted a growing number of counter-attacks at Izium and Kharkiv, gradually expelling Russian forces from a number of settlements. On 30 April, Ukraine launched a large-scale counter-offensive at Kharkiv, retaking the city's suburbs and several more towns over the following days.

May–August 2022

By 4 May, Russian forces had been pushed back to such a distance that most of their artillery could no longer strike Kharkiv. Meanwhile, Russian and DPR/LPR separatist forces continued to attempt to break through Ukrainian defenses at Izium and the Donetsk-Luhansk frontline. On 7 May, Russian forces destroyed several bridges in an attempt to slow down the Ukrainian counter-offensive at Kharkiv. On the same day, Russia and separatist troops also captured Popasna. Following the capture of Popasna, Russia begin attempting to encircle Sievierodonetsk. 

On 10 May, Ukraine made further gains on the Kharkiv front, forcing Russia to redeploy forces from the Izium front to the north. In addition, Ukrainian artillery destroyed an entire Russian battalion tactical group attempting a river crossing in the battle of the Siverskyi Donets. Meanwhile, Russia and the DPR attempted to cement their occupation in eastern Ukraine through political and economic means, likely in an attempt to integrate these areas into the existing separatist republics or establish new ones. On the other side, Ukrainian civilians began organizing resistance movements. As Ukrainian forces retook territory around Kharkiv, local civilian collaborators fled to Russia.

On 12 May, Russian forces seized Rubizhne and the nearby town of Voevodivka. Heavy fighting subsequzently took place at the village of Dovhenke south of Izium, while Russia continued its attempts to encircle Sievierodonetsk. In the latter operation, Russia had begun to focus on cutting the highway at Bakhmut. By 14 May, the Ukrainians claimed to have killed over 6,000 Russian soldiers in Mariupol. They also claimed to have destroyed 78 tanks and 100 other armored vehicles. On 15 May, Ukrainian forces reached the border near Kharkiv, while continuing to push back Russian and LPR units. On the following day, the siege of Mariupol was formally concluded as the Ukrainian military personnel in the city's Azovstal agreed to gradually evacuate and surrender to the Russian forces. Four days later, the Russians announced that they had taken an additional 2,439 Ukrainians prisoners in Mariupol, bringing the total number captured during the siege to 3,917. In addition, it was reported that unrestincluding public protestswas growing among pro-Russian collaborators and separatists in eastern Ukraine, as they accused Russian forces of corruption, incompetence, and forced mobilizations.

Over the following days, Russia made little to no progress at the Izium frontline, but captured some territory around Popasna and Sievierodonetsk, increasingly threatening Sievierodonetsk and Lysychansk with encirclement. Russia also intensified air and artillery strikes targeting Ukrainian positions around Izium, possibly to prepare for renewed attacks. At the northern front, Russia and separatist forces retook a few villages and fortified their positions to stall the Ukrainian counter-offensive.

On 23 May, Russian forces took control of Lyman and attacked Avdiivka. On 24 May, Russian forces attacked from Pospasna with the aim of cutting off Bakhmut, Lysychansk and Sievierodonetsk, gaining some ground. Ukrainian forces made a controlled withdrawal southwest of Pospasna to strengthen their defensive position at Bakhmut. Russia subsequently captured Svitlodarsk.

Around this time, Ukrainian defence adviser Yuriy Sak publicly demanded for more multiple launch rocket systems to reinforce Ukrainian artillery capabilities. On 31 May, the United States announced a military aid package that included precision rocket systems with a range of 80 km.

After a fierce month-long battle that ruined much of the city, Russian and LPR forces captured Sievierodonetsk along the Siverskyi Donets river on 25 June. On the same day, the battle of Lysychansk began, which also saw a Russian victory on 2 July. The following day Russian and LPR forces declared full control of the entire Luhansk region. On 4 July, The Guardian reported that after the fall of the Luhansk oblast, that Russian invasion troops would continue their invasion into the adjacent Donetsk oblast to attack the cities of Sloviansk and Bakhmut. The Russian military declared an "operational pause" to rest and replenish front line forces in Luhansk. On 9 July, a Russian rocket attack on two residential buildings in Chasiv Yar killed at least 48 people.

On 25–26 July, after Russia's operational pause concluded, Russian sources reported that the towns of Berestove, Novoluhanske, and the nearby Vuhlehirska Power Station had been captured. The Institute for the Study of War (ISW) suggested Ukrainian defenders likely conducted a deliberate withdrawal from the area.

September–October 2022

In early September 2022, Ukraine began a major counteroffensive, regaining several settlements in the Kharhkiv region.

The Deputy Chief of the Main Operational Directorate of Ukraine's General Staff, Oleksiy Hromov, alleged on 1 September that Russian president Vladimir Putin had ordered Russian forces to capture the entirety of Donetsk Oblast by 15 September via a renewed offensive. Hromov further alleged that Russia was going to rotate its recently established 3rd Army Corps to the Donetsk front. A senior U.S. defense official dismissed the purported deployment of the "older, unfit, and ill-trained" 3rd Army Corps personnel as being unable to increase Russia's overall combat power in Ukraine.

On 4 September, Zelenskyy announced the liberation of a village in Donetsk Oblast. Ukrainian authorities released a video of their forces entering . On 8 September, Ukrainian forces recaptured more than 20 settlements in Kharkiv Oblast, including the towns of Balakliia and Shevchenkove and 'penetrated Russian defense positions up to 50 km' according to the General staff of the Armed Forces of Ukraine. On the same day a representative of the Russian occupation authorities announced that the 'defense of Kupiansk had begun' and that additional Russian forces are on their way to support the effort, suggesting that Ukrainian elements are close to the town.

On 9 September, Ukrainian forces reached the outskirts of Kupiansk and destroyed the main bridge over the Oskol river in the city center, limiting the ability of the Russian Army to retreat or to bring in reinforcements. In the morning of 10 September, Ukrainian soldiers posted pictures of the Ukrainian flag being raised in front of the town hall. Also on 10 September, Izium, a central command post of the Russians in the region, fell to Ukrainian forces, "with thousands of Russian soldiers abandoning ammunition stockpiles and equipment as they fled." On 11 September, it was reported that the Ukrainians had retaken Velykyi Burluk in Kharkiv Oblast, just  from the border with Russia. Russia responded with missile strikes on civilian areas and on non-military infrastructure facilities like power stations.

On 1 October, Ukrainian forces encircled and entered Lyman. According to Russia's Ministry of Defense, Russian forces had retreated from Lyman.

November 2022–present

By December 2022, the fiercest fighting in Ukraine took place on the eastern front, in the Donbas. Russian and Ukrainian forces funneled reinforcements from other fronts to the Bakhmut–Soledar axis while Ukraine's eastern counteroffensive largely stalled along the Lyman–Kreminna–Svatove axis. Russia spent much of the month consolidating defense lines along the Kreminna–Svatove front, seeking to prevent a Ukrainian breakthrough to the P-66 highway; the Ukrainians, including the 92nd Mechanized Brigade, attempted intermittent local counterattacks across the line of contact while repelling many local Russian assaults. The Kreminna–Svatove line became a defensive flashpoint for Russia, which reportedly reinforced the area with two battalions of T-90 tanks and a few BMPT armored fighting vehicles, and reportedly mobilized elements of Russia's 144th Guards Motor Rifle Division and 8th Guards Combined Arms Army. Both the Russians and Ukrainians claimed to be conducting offensive operations along this front line and repelling local enemy assaults; on 10 December, the Russian defense ministry said it was making new advances east of Lyman while the Institute for the Study of War assessed that Ukraine "likely" controlled Chervonopopivka as of 22 December.

In southern and western Donetsk Oblast, the battle of Marinka continued as Russia continued demolition and reconstruction projects in Mariupol, reportedly seeking to turn the ruined city into a garrison city. Observers accused Russia of using the rebuilding efforts to cover up and destroy evidence of war crimes in Mariupol, particularly the March 2022 Mariupol theatre airstrike. Ukraine also sharply increased shelling of Donetsk city, killing over 10 civilians and wounding many more throughout the month, according to separatist authorities.

The fiercest clashes occurred on the Bakhmut front, with fighting typified by positional trench warfare, artillery duels, and small Russian probing attacks amid freezing winter conditions as Russian regular, separatist, and Wagner Group PMC forces sought to break defense lines on the city's southern and eastern flanks; PMC Wagner fighters spearheaded ground assaults into the city and its satellite suburbs, each of which Ukraine had turned into a stronghold. Media, government officials, and eyewitnesses described the fighting in Bakhmut as a "meat grinder" as both Ukrainian and Russian troops reportedly suffered heavy casualties daily with negligible changes on the front line. Russian forces intensified their encirclement attempts of Bakhmut in the winter, as Wagner broke through Ukrainian defense lines in the salt-mining town of Soledar on 27 December, capturing Bakhmutske and Soledar proper by 16 January 2023, degrading Bakhmut's northeastern defensive flanks.

Order of battle

Russia and pro-Russian separatists 

 
 1st Guards Tank Army
 4th Guards Tank Division
 423rd Motor Rifle Regiment
 13th Tank Regiment
 144th Guards Motor Rifle Division
 2nd CAA
 30th Separate Motorized Infantry Brigade
 5th CAA
 150th Rifle Division
 68th Tank Regiment
 6th CAA
 138th Separate Mechanized Brigade
 8th CAA
 150th Rifle Division
 20th CAA
 3rd Motor Rifle Division
 35th CAA
 1st Guards Tank Army
 68th Army Corps
 64th Guards Motor Rifle Brigade
 41st CAA
 74th Separate Guards Motor Rifle Brigade
 45th Engineer Regiment
 58th CAA
 90th Guards Tank Division
 232nd Rocket Artillery Brigade
 4th Tank Division
 71st Motor Rifle Regiment
 Central Grouping of Forces
 
  Russian Airborne Forces
 76th Guards Air Assault Division
 106th Airborne Division
 
 Russian Naval Infantry
 810th Guards Naval Infantry Brigade
 Black Sea Fleet
 Baltic Fleet
 11th Army Corps
 Northern Fleet
 Pacific Fleet
  Logistical Support of the Russian Armed Forces
 Russian Railway Troops
 29th Separate Railway Brigade
 GRU
  Spetsnaz GRU
 3rd Guards Spetsnaz Brigade
 National Guard of Russia
 141st Special Motorized Regiment
 North Battalion
 DPR Armed Forces
 1st Army Corps
 Republican Guard
 Pyatnashka Brigade
 Sparta Battalion
 Somalia Battalion
 Vostok Battalion
 LNR People's Militia
 2nd Army Corps
 Prizrak Brigade
 Cossack battalions
 Wagner Group
  DShRG Rusich

Ukraine 

 
 4th Tank Brigade
 10th Mountain Assault Brigade
 17th Tank Brigade
 43rd Heavy Artillery Brigade
 53rd Mechanized Brigade
 56th Motorized Brigade
 58th Motorized Brigade
 60th Separate Infantry Brigade
 93rd Mechanized Brigade
 128th Mountain Assault Brigade
 Georgian Legion
 Ukrainian Volunteer Corps
 2nd Separate Battalion
  Ukrainian Air Assault Forces
 46th Airmobile Brigade
 
 80th Air Assault Brigade
 81st Airmobile Brigade
 
 Ukrainian Naval Infantry
 36th Separate Marine Brigade
  Ukrainian Air Force
  Territorial Defense Forces
 227th Kharkiv Territorial Defense Battalion
 International Legion of Territorial Defense of Ukraine
 Kastuś Kalinoŭski Battalion (Belarusian contingent)
 Freedom of Russia Legion
 Armed Forces of the Chechen Republic of Ichkeria-in-exile
 Sheikh Mansur Battalion
 Dzhokhar Dudayev Battalion
 Separate Special-Purpose battalion (including Ajnad al-Kavkaz)
 Ukrainian Ministry of Internal Affairs
  National Guard of Ukraine
 
 
 4th Rapid Reaction Brigade
 Azov Special Operations Detachment
 Donbas Battalion
 Special Tasks Patrol Police
 Sich Battalion
  National Police of Ukraine
  Ukrainian Border Guard
Irregular civilian volunteers (militia)
 Ukrainian guerrillas

See also

 Kyiv offensive (2022)
 Northeastern Ukraine offensive
 Southern Ukraine offensive

Notes

References 

 
April 2022 events in Ukraine
February 2022 events in Ukraine
March 2022 events in Ukraine
History of Donetsk Oblast
History of Kharkiv Oblast
History of Luhansk Oblast
Eastern